Nathanael Greene Pendleton (August 25, 1793 – June 16, 1861) was a U.S. Representative from Ohio, and the father of George Hunt Pendleton.

Born in Savannah, Georgia, August 25, 1793, he moved to New York City with his parents (Nathaniel Pendleton and Susan Bard Pendleton). Pendleton was graduated from Columbia College at New York City in 1813.
He studied law and was admitted to the bar.
He served in the War of 1812.
He moved to Cincinnati, Ohio, in 1818 and practiced law.
He served as a member of the State senate 1825–1827.

Pendleton was elected as a Whig to the Twenty-seventh Congress (March 4, 1841 – March 3, 1843).
He did not seek renomination in 1842.
He died in Cincinnati, Ohio, June 16, 1861.
He was interred in Spring Grove Cemetery.

His great-granddaughter Nathalie Schenck Laimbeer was a pioneering woman banker in New York in the 1910s and 1920s.

Sources

A Guide to the Pendleton Family Papers, 1775-1881

References 

1793 births
1861 deaths
Politicians from Savannah, Georgia
Ohio lawyers
Ohio state senators
Burials at Spring Grove Cemetery
Columbia College (New York) alumni
American military personnel of the War of 1812
Whig Party members of the United States House of Representatives from Ohio
19th-century American politicians
Pendleton family